Gregory Alan Hartle (born February 14, 1951) is a former American football linebacker who played three seasons with the St. Louis Cardinals of the National Football League (NFL). He was drafted by the Cardinals in the tenth round of the 1974 NFL Draft. He played college football at Newberry College and attended Newberry High School in Newberry, South Carolina.

References

External links
Just Sports Stats

Living people
1951 births
Players of American football from Savannah, Georgia
American football linebackers
Newberry Wolves football players
St. Louis Cardinals (football) players